Luciano Vicentín (born 4 April 2000) is an Argentine professional volleyball player. He is a member of the Argentina national team. At the professional club level, he plays for VfB Friedrichshafen. 

Vicentín was called up to his national team for the 2022 World Championship.

Honours

Clubs
 National championships
 2021/2022  German Cup, with VfB Friedrichshafen  
 2021/2022  German Championship, with VfB Friedrichshafen

References

External links

 
 Player profile at Volleybox.net

2000 births
Living people
Sportspeople from Entre Ríos Province
Argentine men's volleyball players
Argentine expatriate sportspeople in Poland
Expatriate volleyball players in Poland
Argentine expatriate sportspeople in Germany
Expatriate volleyball players in Germany
BBTS Bielsko-Biała players
Outside hitters